SS (RMS) Ben-my-Chree (I) No. 21922 was an iron paddle-steamer which served with the Isle of Man Steam Packet Company, and was the first vessel in the company to bear the name.

Dimensions
Ben-my-Chree had a registered tonnage of 458. However, in the Company's Fleet List it was recorded as 399. Length 151'9"; beam 23'; depth 12'5"; speed (approximately) 9 knots.

Construction and service life
Ben-my-Chree was built by Robert Napier and Sons at Glasgow in 1845 at a cost of £11,500. Ben-my-Chrees engine was taken from another Company ship, the Queen of the Isle, before that vessel was sold and converted to a full rig sailing ship. The speed of Ben-my-Chree is not recorded, but Napier's engine had produced a speed of 9 knots in the earlier ship.

Ben-my-Chree has the distinction of being the first iron-built vessel in the Steam Packet Fleet.

Disposal and subsequent fate
After 15 years service, Ben-my-Chree was disposed of by the Company in 1860. She was sent to Leith, Scotland, and sold by Tod and McGregor for £1,200 (equivalent to £ in ) to the African Steamship Company.

After many years service, she was reported to be lying a hulk on the Bonny River, West Africa, 85 years after her launching.

References

Ships of the Isle of Man Steam Packet Company
1845 ships
Ferries of the Isle of Man
Passenger ships of the United Kingdom
Steamships of the United Kingdom
Paddle steamers of the United Kingdom
Merchant ships of the United Kingdom
Ships built on the River Clyde